Pappayude Swantham Appoos is a 1992 Indian Malayalam-language film, written and directed by Fazil.It stars Mammootty and Master Badusha while Shobana, Suresh Gopi and Seena Dadi also appeared in important supporting roles. The music of the movie was composed by Ilaiyaraaja.The movie explores the relationship between a father who is depressed after the death of his wife and his neglected son. Badusha won the 1992 Kerala State Film Award for Best Child Artist. The film was the commercial success at the box office and was the  highest grosser of 1992 and played for more than 250+ days in theatre.

Plot
Balachandran had resorted to his work after being unable to cope up with the death of his wife, Bhama. During the process, he unintentionally neglects his only son, Appu. When Appu returns home from his boarding school during vacation, Balachandran promises him many things, but is unable to fulfill any of them as he is caught up with work. Meanwhile, Appu befriends his Nanny Meenakshi, much to the annoyance of Balachandran.

Meenakshi's half-brother Rudran, after realizing that his sister stays with Balachandran (who fired him for the murder of a colleague), forcefully takes her home. Appu becomes disappointed and turns rebellious, which culminates in Balachandran hitting him. He now realises that Bhama's death was tough on his son too. He apologises and promises to bring back Meenakshi.

At Meenakshi's house, her brother objects to Balachandran's request of taking her back and he sees the way she is mistreated by her brother, leading to a fight between them, where Appu gets caught up. The attempt fails and they retreat to their summer house, deciding to let go of the thoughts of Meenakshi. Appu now gets to spend more time with his father as he had always hoped, although he misses Meenakshi. Balachandran notices that Appu's nose is lightly bleeding and takes him to his close friend, Dr. Gopan. Gopan find a serious internal haemorrhage in Appu's head, the cause of which remains a mystery. He informs that an urgent surgery is their only hope and his Professor, a famous neurosurgeon is called from Mumbai for the surgery.

The cause of the bleeding puzzles the doctors. Balachandran soon recollects the fight and recalls Rudran being the one responsible for Appu's condition. Enraged by the thought, he rushes to seek revenge, but is stopped by Gopan by shouting that if he really loves his son, he should stay with him till the operation, take care of him and pray for him. The depth of his neglect of his son, now becomes clear to him. Realizing that this was probably the only time left with his son, he takes him out as he had promised, to fulfill Appu's wish, on the eve of the scheduled operation. He even prays hoping that God would have pity upon him. Their journey takes them to Meenakshi's house, who is to be married against her wishes. Another fight happens between the two and he manages to free Meenakshi from her abusive brother. He takes her with them for one final trip where Appu (moderately under sedation) hallucinates of his mother approaching him to take him to the other side. However, when Bhama notices Balachandran and Meenakshi together, she realizes that it is their chance to start a new family and walks away, implying the likelihood of Appu's survival.

Cast
Mammootty as Balachandran, Appu's Father
Master Badusha as Appu
 Varna Sundaresh as Baby Appu
Seena Dadi as Meenakshi
Suresh Gopi as Dr. Gopan 
Shobhana as Bhama, Appu's Mother 
Sankaradi
K. P. A. C. Sunny
Ravindran as Rudran, Meenakshi's Step Brother
Subair
Kaviyoor Ponnamma
T. P. Madhavan
 Santhakumari
 Fahadh Faasil
Farhaan Faasil

Production

Casting 
Actor Murali was originally scheduled to play Dr. Gopan, but had to withdraw from the film due to a date clash. He was replaced by Suresh Gopi. Fazil's sons and now turned actors Fahadh Faasil and Farhaan Faasil made their theatrical debuts as a child artists in this movie. They can be seen standing in the group of kids during the party sequence and during the picturization of the song "Kaaka Poocha Kokkara".

Track listing

Box office
The film was both commercial and critical success. It ran in theaters for more than 200 days and was the highest grossing Malayalam film of 1992.

Awards 
Kerala Film Chamber Award 1992: Most Popular Film

Remake
The film was remade in Telugu as Priyaragalu (1997).

References

External links

1992 films
1990s Malayalam-language films
Films scored by Ilaiyaraaja
Films directed by Fazil
Indian drama films
Malayalam films remade in other languages